Amyntaio (before 1928: Σόροβιτς - Sorovits; Bulgarian/Macedonian: Суровичево, Сорович), is a town and municipality in the Florina regional unit of Macedonia, Greece. The population of Amyntaio proper is 4,306, while that of the entire municipality is 16,973 (2011). The town is named after the ancient king of Macedon, and father of Philip II and grandfather of Alexander the Great, Amyntas III.

History
The village mosque was destroyed and located at the site of the present Municipal Centre building.

Archaeological excavations

On March 4, 2007, an unknown civilization around four lakes that lasted from 6000 BC to 60 BC has been uncovered in two important excavations of a Neolithic and an Iron Age settlement in the Amyntaio district of Florina, northern Greece.

A 7,300-year-old home with a timber floor, remnants of food supplies and blackberry seeds are among the findings in a Neolithic settlement near the lakes of Vegoritida, Petres, Heimatitida and Zazari. Garments, women’s fashions and burial customs in northern Eordaia 3,000 years ago are coming to light among the hundreds of funeral offerings in a forgotten necropolis dating from the Iron Age in western Macedonia.

More than 100 years after the excavation at Agios Panteleimonas in Amyntaio in the Florina prefecture – known in the bibliography as the Pateli Necropolis – by the Russian Archaeological Institute of Istanbul, a systematic investigation of 12 tombs by the 17th Antiquities Ephorate has found a total of 358 tombs dating from between 950 BC and 550 BC. Although the first discovery in 1898 of 376 graves produced many findings, now in the Istanbul Museum, the necropolis between the lakes of Heimatitida and Petres has revealed hundreds more graves.

In the summer of 2017 the remnants of a remarkable Roman villa were discovered.

Transport
Amyntaio station is a railway junction, where the line to Kozani branches off from the Platy-Florina main line.

Municipality

The municipality Amyntaio was formed at the 2011 local government reform by the merger of the following 6 former municipalities, that became municipal units:
Aetos
Amyntaio
Filotas
Lechovo
Nymfaio
Variko

The municipality has an area of 589.369 km2, the municipal unit 249.852 km2.

Subdivisions
The municipal unit of Amyntaio is divided into the following communities:
Agios Panteleimonas
Amyntaio
Kella
Kleidi
Petres
Rodonas
Fanos
Xino Nero

Economy
 Amyntaio Power Station

References

External links
Official website of Amyntaio Municipality (in Greek).

 
Populated places in Florina (regional unit)
Wine regions of Greece
Archaeological sites in Macedonia (Greece)
Municipalities of Western Macedonia